These are the results of the open water swimming competition at the 2005 World Aquatics Championships, which took place in Montreal, Quebec, Canada.

The open water swimming course was held in the Olympic Rowing Basin on Notre Dame Island, and not in a river. This was the first time that open water swimming was held in a pool. The Montreal Olympic Rowing Basin was built for the 1976 Montreal Olympics.

Medal table

Medal summary

Men

Record(*)

Women

Record(*)

References

Open Water results section of the 2005 World Championships results from OmegaTiming.com; retrieved 2019-07-18.

 
Open water swimming
2005 in swimming
Open water swimming at the World Aquatics Championships